Delaware River could refer to:

 Delaware River, a major river on the coast of the Atlantic Ocean, in New York, New Jersey, Pennsylvania, and Delaware
 the namesake for the Philadelphia metropolitan area, called the Delaware Valley
 Delaware River (Kansas), a tributary of the Kansas River in Kansas
 Delaware River (Texas), a tributary of the Pecos River in Texas and New Mexico